Sleepwalker(s) or The Sleepwalker(s) may refer to:

 Sleepwalking or somnambulism, a sleep disorder

Film and television

Films
 The Sleepwalker (1922 film), an American silent film directed by Edward LeSaint
 The Sleepwalker (1942 film), a Disney animated short film featuring Pluto
 The Sleepwalker (1951 film), a French film directed by Maurice Labro
 Sleepwalkers (1978 film), a Spanish film by Manuel Gutiérrez Aragón
 Sleepwalker, a 1984 film featuring Fulton Mackay
 Sleepwalkers (1992 film), an American horror film written by Stephen King
 Sleepwalker (2000 film), a Swedish horror-thriller film directed by Johannes Runeborg
 Sleepwalker (2011 film), a Hong Kong film directed by Oxide Pang
 The Sleepwalker (2014 film), a Norwegian-American drama directed by Mona Fastvold
 The Sleepwalker (2015 film), a Canadian animated short film directed by Theodore Ushev
 Sleepwalker (2017 film), an American mystery film directed by Elliott Lester
 The Sleepwalkers (2019 film), an Argentine film directed by Paula Hernández

Television
 Sleepwalkers (TV series), a 1997–98 American science fiction series
 "The Sleepwalker" (The Honeymooners), a television episode

Literature
 Sleepwalker (comics), a Marvel Comics character
 The Sleepwalker (novel), a 2008 novel by Robert Muchamore
 The Sleepwalker (Fear Street), a 1990 novel by R. L. Stine
 The Sleepwalkers (Broch novel), a 1930s novel in three parts by Hermann Broch
 The Sleepwalkers (Koestler book), a 1959 book by Arthur Koestler
 The Sleepwalkers: How Europe Went to War in 1914, a 2012 book by Christopher Clark

Music
 La sonnambula (The Sleepwalker), an 1831 opera semiseria by Vincenzo Bellini

Albums
 Sleepwalker (The Kinks album) or the title song (see below), 1977
 Sleepwalker (EP), by Kylie and Garibay, 2014
 Sleepwalker, by JamisonParker, 2005
 Sleepwalkers (Brian Fallon album) or the title song, 2018
 Sleepwalkers (David Sylvian album) or the title song, 2010
 Sleepwalkers, by Dead Swans, 2009

Songs
 "Sleepwalker" (Adam Lambert song), 2011
 "Sleepwalker" (The Kinks song), 1977
 "Sleepwalker" (Nightwish song), 2000
 "Sleepwalker", by Bonnie McKee, 2013
 "Sleepwalker", by Daniel Johns from Talk, 2015
 "Sleepwalker", by Faunts from M4, 2006
 "Sleepwalker", by Gang of Four from Shrinkwrapped, 1995
 "Sleepwalker", by King Gizzard & the Lizard Wizard from Oddments, 2014
 "Sleepwalker", by Logan Henderson, 2017
 "Sleepwalker", by Megadeth from United Abominations, 2007
 "Sleepwalker", by Of Monsters and Men from Fever Dream, 2019
 "Sleepwalker", by Parkway Drive from Deep Blue, 2010
 "Sleepwalker", by the Wallflowers from Breach, 2000
 "Sleepwalker", by Xmal Deutschland from Devils, 1989
 "The Sleepwalker", by Cat Power from Dear Sir, 1995
 "Sleepwalkers", by Bone Thugs-n-Harmony from The Collection, 2000
 "Sleepwalkers", by They Might Be Giants from No!, 2002
 "Sleepwalkers", by the Hundred in the Hands from This Desert, 2010
 "The Sleepwalkers", by Level 42 from Running in the Family, 1987
 "The Sleepwalkers", by Van Der Graaf Generator from Godbluff, 1975

Other uses
 Sleepwalker (Štyrský), a 1925 painting by Jindřich Štyrský
 Sleepwalker (video game), a 1993 platform game
 Sleepwalkers (video installation), a 2007 outdoor film installation by Doug Aitken

See also
 Sleepwalk (disambiguation)
 Sleepwalking (disambiguation)